Marcel Kappelmaier (born 14 April 1991) is a German footballer who plays as a defender. He played in the 3. Liga for SpVgg Unterhaching.

Career

Kappelmaier began his career with 1860 Munich, and was promoted to the reserve team in 2010. He played 34 times in the Regionalliga Süd over the next two years, scoring once, and was given a squad number for the first-team for the 2011–12 season, but didn't make any appearances. In July 2012 he signed for SpVgg Unterhaching of the 3. Liga, alongside teammates Daniel Hofstetter and Marius Willsch. After six appearances in the first half of the 2012–13 season, he was released on a free transfer.

External links

1991 births
Living people
German footballers
TSV 1860 Munich II players
SpVgg Unterhaching players
3. Liga players
Association football fullbacks
Sportspeople from Ingolstadt
Footballers from Bavaria